William Reed (February 21, 1839 – May 30, 1918) was an American soldier who fought for the Union Army during the American Civil War. He received the Medal of Honor for valor.

Biography
Reed received the Medal of Honor in December 12, 1895 for his actions at the Battle of Vicksburg on May 22, 1863 while with Company H of the 8th Missouri Volunteer Infantry.

Medal of Honor citation

Citation:

The President of the United States of America, in the name of Congress, takes pleasure in presenting the Medal of Honor to Private William Reed, United States Army, for gallantry in the charge of the volunteer storming party on 22 May 1863, while serving with Company H, 8th Missouri Infantry, in action at Vicksburg, Mississippi.

See also

List of American Civil War Medal of Honor recipients: Q–S

References

External links

1839 births
1918 deaths
Union Army soldiers
United States Army Medal of Honor recipients
American Civil War recipients of the Medal of Honor
Military personnel from Pennsylvania